George Chigova (born 4 March 1991) is a Zimbabwean professional footballer who plays as a goalkeeper for Premier Soccer League club SuperSport United.

Club career
In February 2014, Chigova was sold to South African club SuperSport United for $120,000. However, Chigova didn't officially join the club until July of that year.

In July 2015, Chigova moved to Polokwane City, signing a three-year deal. He made his league debut for the club on 22 September 2015, keeping a clean sheet in a 0-0 draw with Orlando Pirates F.C.

International career
In January 2014, coach Ian Gorowa, invited him to be a part of the Zimbabwe squad for the 2014 African Nations Championship. He helped the team to a fourth-place finish after being defeated by Nigeria by a goal to nil.

Honours

International
Zimbabwe
COSAFA Cup: 2017, 2018

References

External links
 
 

1991 births
Living people
Sportspeople from Harare
Zimbabwean footballers
Zimbabwe A' international footballers
Dynamos F.C. players
SuperSport United F.C. players
Polokwane City F.C. players
Association football goalkeepers
2014 African Nations Championship players
2019 Africa Cup of Nations players
Zimbabwe international footballers